Sisters Beach is a locality and small town located in the Waratah-Wynyard municipality of Tasmania within fifteen minutes of Wynyard, in Tasmania's North West. It is located within the Rocky Cape National Park and is situated on the old horse trail known as the Postman's Track that once formed the only connection between Emu Bay (now Burnie) and the Van Diemen's Land outpost of Stanley.

It has a beach of white sand, approximately three kilometres in length. A unique aspect of Sisters Beach is the prevalence of giant Banksia serrata. It is the only place in Tasmania where they occur.

Building new homes is currently restricted, due to the surrounding national park. It was originally established by the Irby family, descendants of whom still live in the area.

Gallery

References

Localities of Waratah–Wynyard Council
Towns in Tasmania
Beaches of Tasmania